This is a list of past and present satellites of the Galileo navigation system.

As of August 2022, 28 Galileo (4 IOV "In Orbit Validation" and 24 FOC "Full Operational Capability") satellites have been launched. The 2 GIOVE prototype vehicles were retired in 2012, 24 satellites are operational, 1 is not available and 3 are currently not usable.

FOC satellites were awarded and built in several batches.
 Batch-1 consists of 14 FOC satellites (Galileo-FOC FM1 to Galileo-FOC FM14) and was built by OHB System, with the contribution of Surrey Satellite Technology Limited (SSTL).
 Batch-2 consists of 8 FOC satellites (Galileo-FOC FM15 to Galileo-FOC FM22) and was built by OHB System, with the contribution of Surrey Satellite Technology Limited (SSTL).
 Batch-3 consists of 12 FOC satellites (Galileo-FOC FM23 to Galileo-FOC FM34) and is being built by OHB in Bremen, Germany, with the contribution of Surrey Satellite Technology (SSTL) in Guildford, United Kingdom.

In parallel to Batch-3's completion, the new Galileo Second Generation (G2G) satellites, featuring electric propulsion, enhanced navigation signals and capabilities, inter-satellite links and reconfigurability in space, in 2021 were in development by Thales Alenia Space (TAS) and Airbus Defence and Space, with their deployment expected to begin by late 2024.

Satellites 
Each satellite is named after a child that won the European Commission's Galileo drawing competition. One winner was selected from each member state of the European Union.

Refer to Galileo Constellation Information for the most up-to-date information on the constellation status.

Summary table

Orbital slots 
Refer to Galileo Constellation Information for the most up-to-date information.

See also 

 List of BeiDou satellites
 List of GLONASS satellites
 List of GPS satellites
 List of NAVIC satellites

References 

Galileo
 
Galileo
Galileo
Galileo